2021 WAFF U-18 Championship, also called 2021 EarthLink WAFF U-18 Championship due to sponsorship by EarthLink Telecommunications, was the second edition of the West Asian Football Federation (WAFF)'s under-18 championship. It took place between 20 November and 1 December 2021 in Iraq.

The tournament featured nine teams divided into a two groups of four and five. Hosts Iraq won the tournament, beating Lebanon on penalty shoot-outs in the final.

Teams

Participants

Format
Two groups of nine teams; the host country Iraq were in Group A, which contained five teams, while Group B contained four teams. Unlike the previous edition, only the group winners advance directly to the final.

Squads
A total of nine teams played in the tournament, with players born on or after 1 January 2003 eligible to participate. Each team had to register a squad of up to 23 players, three of whom must be goalkeepers.

Officials

Referees
 Mohamad Juma (Bahrain)
 Wathiq Abdullah (Iraq)
 Mohamad Arafah (Jordan)
 Mohamad Mofeed Ghabayen (Jordan) 
 Saad Khalifa (Kuwait)
 Maher Al Ali (Lebanon) 
 Sheikh Ahmad Alaeddin (Lebanon) 
 Braa Abu Aishah (Palestine) 
 Mohamad Kanah (Syria) 
 Waleed Khaloofa (Yemen) 

Assistant referees
 Faisal Al-Alawi (Bahrain)
 Maytham Khammat (Iraq)
 Hamza Saadeh (Jordan) 
 Mahmoud Abu Thaher (Jordan) 
 Saoud Al-Shemali (Kuwait)
 Ahmad Al Hussaini (Lebanon) 
 Mohamad Al Hajje (Lebanon) 
 Ashraf Abu Zubaida (Palestine) 
 Mohamad Al-Sayed Ali (Syria) 
 Omar Haddad (Yemen)

Venue

Groups stage

Group A

Group B

Final

Champion

Player awards
The following awards were given at the conclusion of the tournament:

Goalscorers

References

External links 
 WAFF official website

2021 in Asian football
WAFF Championship tournaments
2021
Sport in Erbil
2021 in Iraqi sport
November 2021 sports events in Asia
December 2021 sports events in Asia